Hazeltine Park is a  park located at 5416 Southeast Flavel Drive, in Portland, Oregon's Brentwood-Darlington neighborhood, in the United States. The park, acquired in 2001, is named after Dick Hazeltine, who is considered the neighborhood's "founder".

See also

 List of parks in Portland, Oregon

References

2001 establishments in Oregon
Brentwood-Darlington, Portland, Oregon
Parks in Portland, Oregon
Protected areas established in 2001